Bradenton Athletics were a professional American women's soccer team based in Bradenton, Florida. The team was a member of the United Soccer Leagues W-League, then the premier women's soccer league in the United States and Canada, from 2004 to 2008, when they folded. They played in the Atlantic Division of the W-League's Eastern Conference.

The team was associated with the IMG Soccer Academy, the United States Soccer Federation's full-time youth residency program, which itself is part of the larger IMG Academies organization initiated by tennis coach Nick Bollettieri in 1978. They played their home games at the IMG Soccer Academy's stadium in Bradenton. The team was a sister organization of the men's Bradenton Academics team, which plays in the USL Premier Development League. Their colors were blue, gold and black.

2008 roster

Year-by-year

External links
Bradenton Athletics

Soccer clubs in Florida
Women's soccer clubs in the United States
Defunct USL W-League (1995–2015) teams
2004 establishments in Florida
2008 disestablishments in Florida
Association football clubs established in 2004
Association football clubs disestablished in 2008
Women's sports in Florida